James Allan (11 September 1860, in East Taieri, New Zealand – 2 September 1934, in Hāwera, New Zealand) was a New Zealand rugby union player who played eight games for the All Blacks, the New Zealand national rugby union team, and was nicknamed the Taieri Giant. Allan played in the first match contested by the New Zealand team, and the New Zealand Rugby Union regard him as the first ever All Black.

Allan played as a forward and played six seasons for his province Otago, from 1881 to 1886. Allan's eight All Black appearances came on the 1884 New Zealand rugby union tour of New South Wales on which he scored three tries. He was one of New Zealand's most valuable players. on the tour, where he played eight of the All Blacks' nine games – all played over 23 days.

Allan was highly regarded as a forward with contemporary reports saying he was "consistently in the vanguard". Allan was also reported to be never far away from the ball along with being as "hard as nails". During his playing career at Otago, Allan became a distinguished player for the province. He had three other brothers who represented Otago.

Allan was a pupil of Otago Boys' High School.

References

External links

1860 births
1934 deaths
New Zealand international rugby union players
People educated at Otago Boys' High School
Rugby union forwards
Rugby union players from Otago